The Women's double sculls competition at the 2012 Summer Olympics in London took place are at Dorney Lake which, for the purposes of the Games venue, is officially termed Eton Dorney.

Schedule

All times are British Summer Time (UTC+1)

Results

Heats
First two of each heat qualify to the final, remainder goes to the repeachge.

Heat 1

Heat 2

Repechage
First two qualify to the final.

Finals

Final B

Final A

References

Women's double sculls
Women's double sculls